Kylix  is a genus of sea snails, marine gastropod mollusks in the family Drilliidae.

Species in this genus are characterized by an incised sculpture, a simple aperture and a more delicate shell. They have a dorsal varix, a protrusion on the back of the body whorl.

Species
Species within the genus Kylix  include:
 Kylix alcyone (Dall, 1919)
 Kylix contracta McLean & Poorman, 1971
 Kylix halocydne (Dall, 1919)
 Kylix hecuba (Dall, 1919)
 Kylix ianthe (Dall, 1919)
 Kylix impressa (Hinds, 1843)
 Kylix panamella (Dall, 1908)
 Kylix paziana (Dall, 1919)
 Kylix rugifera (Sowerby I, 1834)
 Kylix woodringi McLean & Poorman, 1971
 Kylix zacae Hertlein & Strong, 1951
Species brought into synonymy
 Kylix albemarlensis H.A. Pilsbry & E.G. Vanatta, 1902: synonym of: Kylix rugifera (G.B. I Sowerby, 1834)
 Kylix alcmene Dall, 1919: synonym of Calliclava alcmene (Dall, 1919) 
 Kylix turveri Hertlein, L.G. & A.M. Strong, 1951: synonym of Calliclava alcmene (Dall, 1919)

References

External links

 
Gastropod genera